The müsa, or müsa appenninica, is a bagpipe from the Apennines of north-west Italy which was commonly used to accompany the piffero in the  folk music of the Quattro Province: the ‘Four Provinces’ of (Pavia, Alessandria, Genoa and Piacenza). In the 1930s, however, the instrument fell into disfavour and was generally displaced by the accordion.

Discografia
1986: I Suonatori delle quattro province - Musica trdizionale dell'Appennino - Robi Droli
1987: Baraban - I canti rituali, i balli, il piffero - ACB
1993: I Suonatori delle quattro province - Racconti a colori - Robi Droli
2001: I Müsetta - La vulp la vâ 'ntla vigna - Folkclub-Ethnosuoni 
2003: Enerbia - Così lontano l’azzurro - EDT
2004: Musicisti Vari - Tilion - Folkclub-Ethnosuoni
2006: Musicisti Vari  - Le tradizioni musicali delle quattro province - SOPRIP

External links
Descrizione, storia e costruttori
Museo etnografico Guatelli
Sito Epinfrai
Le altre cornamuse del Nord Italia: il baghèt

Italian musical instruments
Bagpipes